Zuzana Čížková also known as Zuzana Klára Čížková(born 10 December 1982) is a Czech sculptor and painter.

Although born in Prague, Czechoslovakia, Zuzana Čížková was raised in Brandýs nad Labem in Central Bohemia. During her childhood, she was inspired by her grandfather who was an art restorer. She studied at High school of sculptures and stone-cutting in Hořice at the foothills of the Krkonoše mountains.

Later she continued her studies at the Academy of Arts, Architecture and Design in Prague, in the Sculpture Atelier led by Professor Kurt Gebauer; she graduated in 2011. 
During and shortly after her high school studies Zuzana Čížková specialized in traditional technologies and materials (stone and gypsum). Later on, she started to experiment with materials she had already employed earlier in her education. She was discovering of new and non-traditional concrete (cement-mortar mixture) which she achieved in cooperation with the Research Institute of cement - mortar in Radotín (part of Prague).

She caught the attention of the audience, not only in Czech Republic, but also in France. In Paris, she twice took part in the Salon des Artistes Independants (2006 and 2007) as a representative of young Czech artistes. Later she made exhibition with a French painter Valexia. Zuzana Čížková also participated at two internships in Basel in Switzerland and Carrar Quarry in Italy. In the year 2009 she received the Winton Train Award – “Inspiration by Goodness Prague – London”.

She has created dozens of monumental sculptures for public areas (for example in Čížkov, Ostrava—Landek, Brandýs nad Labem, Poděbrady, Prague - Prosek and Prague - Smíchov.)

She lives and works in  Dobřichovice.

Permanent installation in public areas (selection) 

Ivory of mammoth, in Ostrava – Landek, stone (2006)
Mistress of Emperor Rudolf II in Brandýs nad Labem, concrete (2006)
Three Madonnas in Prague – Prosek, marble, sandstone, granite (2010)
Sign language sculpture "Life is beautiful, be happy and love each other"  – in Prague – Smíchov, concrete (2011)
Monument to Saint Agnes of Bohemia in Poděbrady, artificial sandstone (2012)
Monument to the Czech painter Ludvík Kuba in Poděbrady, concrete (2013)

Gallery

External links 
 Nehasit, hořím - Zuzana Čížková Czech television, 2006 
 Televizní klub neslyšících Česká televize, 2011 
 Ještě hořím - Zuzana Čížková Czech television, 2021 
 Article in periodical Beton TKS Beton TKS 5/2011 in Czech/English
 CV in English Own web page
 Presentation of her paintings and other works Old website
 Personal website - presentation of her paintings and other works New website
 Presentation of her paintings and other works Own web page

Czech sculptors
Czech women sculptors
Czech women painters
Czech graphic designers
1982 births
Living people
21st-century Czech women artists
Women graphic designers
Academy of Arts, Architecture and Design in Prague alumni